Michał Szulkin (1908-1992) - a Polish historian, brother of Paweł Szulkin
Paweł Szulkin (1912-1987) - a Polish physicist, brother of Michał Szulkin, father of Piotr Szulkin
Piotr Szulkin - a Polish film director, son of Paweł Szulkin